The 2016–17 Slovenian Second League season was the 26th edition of the Slovenian Second League. The season began on 7 August 2016 and ended on 27 May 2017.

Teams

Promotion and relegation (pre-season)
Krka and Zavrč were relegated from the 2015–16 Slovenian PrvaLiga
Brda and Brežice 1919 were promoted from the 2015–16 Slovenian Third League 
Radomlje and Aluminij were promoted to the 2016–17 Slovenian PrvaLiga   
Šenčur and Tolmin were relegated to the 2016–17 Slovenian Third League.

Stadiums and managers

Standings

League table

Positions by round

Results

First and second cycle

Third cycle

Season statistics

Top goalscorers

Source: NZS

Attendances

 
Note 1:Team played the previous season in the Slovenian PrvaLiga.  Note 2:Team played the previous season in the Slovenian Third League.

See also
2016–17 Slovenian Cup
2016–17 Slovenian PrvaLiga
2016–17 Slovenian Third League

References

External links
Official website 

Slovenian Second League seasons
2016–17 in Slovenian football
Slovenia, 2016-17